Orthoserica is a genus of moths in the family Geometridae.Its species include Orthoserica mirandaria and Orthoserica refrigsea.

References

Sterrhinae